A quantity surveyor (QS) is a construction industry professional with expert knowledge on construction costs and contracts.  Qualified professional quantity surveyors are known as Chartered Surveyors (Members and Fellows of RICS) in the UK and Certified Quantity Surveyors (a designation of AIQS) in Australia and other countries. In some countries such as Canada, South Africa, Kenya and Mauritius, qualified quantity surveyors are known as Professional Quantity Surveyors, a title protected by law.

Quantity surveyors are responsible for managing all aspects of the contractual and financial side of construction projects. They help to ensure that the construction project is completed within its projected budget. Quantity surveyors are also hired by contractors to help with the valuation of construction work for the contractor, help with bidding and project budgeting, and the submission of bills to the client.

Duties
The duties of a quantity surveyor are as follows:
 Cost estimate, cost planning and cost management
 Analyzing terms and conditions in the contract.
 Predicting potential risks in the project and taking precautions to mitigate such.
 Forecasting the costs of different materials needed for the project.
 Prepare tender documents, contracts, budgets and other documentation.
 Take note of changes made and adjusting the budget accordingly.
 Tender management including preparation of bills of quantities, contract conditions and assembly of tender documents
 Contract management and contractual advice
 Valuation of construction work
 Claims and dispute management
Lifecycle costing analysis

Professional associations

 RICS – The Royal Institution of Chartered Surveyors
 AIQS – Australian Institute of Quantity Surveyors	
 IQSSL - Institute of Quantity Surveyors Sri Lanka
 ASAQS – Association of South African Quantity Surveyors	
 BSIJ – Building Surveyors Institute of Japan
 CICES - Chartered Institution of Civil Engineering Surveyors
 CIQS – Canadian Institute of Quantity Surveyors
 CCEA - China Cost Engineering Association 
 HKIS – Hong Kong Institute of Surveyors
 IIQS – Indian Institute of Quantity Surveyors	
 IQSI – Ikatan Quantity Surveyor Indonesia
 JIQS – Jamaican Institute of Quantity Surveyors
 NIQS – Nigerian Institute of Quantity Surveyors
 NZIQS – New Zealand Institute of Quantity Surveyors
 PICQS – Philippine Institute of Certified Quantity Surveyors
 RISM – The Royal Institution of Surveyors Malaysia
 SISV – Singapore Institute of Surveyors and Valuers
 SCSI – Society of Chartered Surveyors Ireland
 SACQSP – South African Council for Quantity Surveying Profession
 IQSK – Institute of Quantity Surveyors of Kenya
 QSI - Quantity Surveyor International
 GHIS - Ghana Institute of Surveyors
 UNTEC - Union nationale des Économistes de la construction (France)

Qualification
A university degree or diploma alone does not allow one to register as a Quantity Surveyor. Usually, anyone looking to qualify as a Chartered Quantity Surveyor, Certified Quantity Surveyor or Professional Quantity Surveyor must hold appropriate educational qualifications and work experience, and must pass a professional competence assessment. 

The RICS requires an RICS approved degree, several years of practical experience, and passing the Assessment of Professional Competence (APC) to qualify as a Chartered Quantity Surveyor. Some candidates may be entitled to qualify through extensive experience and reciprocity agreements.

See also 
Cost engineering

References

Building estimators
Construction and extraction occupations
Construction management
Building engineering